Medicine Owl Lake is located in Glacier National Park, in the U. S. state of Montana. Amphitheater Mountain rises to the southwest and  Medicine Owl Peak is immediately west of the lake. Medicine Owl Lake is in the remote backcountry of Glacier National Park and no designated or maintained trails are nearby.

See also
List of lakes in Glacier County, Montana

References

Lakes of Glacier National Park (U.S.)
Lakes of Glacier County, Montana